The 2008 San Francisco Giants season was the Giants' 126th year in Major League Baseball, and their ninth at AT&T Park. The team finished in fourth place in the National League West with a 72–90 record, 12 games behind the Los Angeles Dodgers.  2008 marks their 50th Anniversary in the Bay Area since moving from New York in 1958.  It is also their first since 1992 without all-time home run champion Barry Bonds, who was not re-signed following the 2007 season. At the end of the season, Tim Lincecum was voted the 2008 National League Cy Young Award winner.

Pre-season
On September 21, 2007, Giants' ownership announced that Bonds would not return after the 2007 season.  The Giants did not resign Ryan Klesko and Pedro Feliz.  On December 12, 2007 the Giants signed Aaron Rowand to a five-year and $60 million contract.

The Giants finished spring training with a record of 9–23–2, the worst spring training in their recorded history. The Giants had the highest ERA and the lowest batting average among teams whose spring training was in Arizona.  The team lead the majors with 40 errors.  The Giants lost a spring training game 4–3 to their Triple-A affiliate Fresno Grizzlies.  Giants opening day starter Barry Zito allowed 24 earned runs in 25 innings in spring training.

Giants spring training included injuries and competitions for several roster positions.  Steve Holm won the back up catcher spot against Eliezer Alfonzo and Guillermo Rodríguez.  Relievers Merkin Valdez, Erick Threets, and Keiichi Yabu earned spots on the opening day roster.  Noah Lowry, Vinnie Chulk, Kevin Frandsen and Omar Vizquel started the season the on disabled list.  Brian Bocock was the opening day shortstop in place of Vizquel.  Steve Kline was designated for assignment.  The Giants claimed Jose Castillo off waivers from the Florida Marlins late March 2008.  He was the opening day third baseman. Kevin Correia won the competition to be the team's 5th starter.

The Giants were widely expected to miss the playoffs in 2008, according to numerous sports writers.

Regular season
On May 16, 2008, Peter Magowan, the owner who brought Barry Bonds to San Francisco, built a new ballpark and kept major league baseball in the city, announced he would be stepping down as the managing partner of the Giants. Effective October 1, 2008 Bill Neukom would be the new managing partner of the Giants.

Season standings

Record vs. opponents

Game log

|- align="center" bgcolor="#ffbbbb"
| 1 || March 31 || @ Dodgers || 5–0 || Penny (1–0) || Zito (0–1) || || 56,000 || 0–1
|- align="center" bgcolor="#ffbbbb"
| 2 || April 1 || @ Dodgers || 3–2 || Saito (1–0)  || Yabu (0–1)|| || 44,054 || 0–2 
|- align="center" bgcolor="bbffbb"
| 3 || April 2 || @ Dodgers || 2–1 || Lincecum (1–0) || Loaiza (0–1) || Wilson (1) || 43,217 || 1–2
|- align="center" bgcolor="ffbbbb"
| 4 || April 4 || @ Brewers || 13–4 || Villanueva (1–0) || Sánchez (0–1) || Torres (1) || 45,212 || 1–3
|- align="center" bgcolor="ffbbbb"
| 5 || April 5  || @ Brewers || 5–4 || Parra (1–0) || Correia (0–1) || Gagné (1) || 30,574 || 1–4
|- align="center" bgcolor="ffbbbb"
| 6 || April 6 || @ Brewers || 7–0 || Sheets (1–0) || Zito (0–2) || || 44,014 || 1–5
|- align="center" bgcolor="ffbbbb"
| 7 || April 7 || Padres || 8–4 || Maddux (1–0) || Cain (0–1) || || 42,861 || 1–6
|- align="center" bgcolor="bbffbb"
| 8 || April 8 || Padres || 3–2 || Hennessey (1–0) || Meredith (0–1) || || 35,795 || 2–6
|- align="center" bgcolor="bbffbb"
| 9 || April 9 || Padres || 1–0 || Walker (1–0) || Bell (0–1) || || 30,310 || 3–6
|- align="center" bgcolor="bbffbb"
| 10 ||April 10 || Cardinals || 5–1 || Correia (1–1) || Wainwright (1–1) || Wilson (2) || 30,333 || 4–6
|- align="center" bgcolor="ffbbbb"
| 11 || April 11 || Cardinals || 8–2 || Lohse (2–0) || Zito (0–3) || || 33,954 || 4–7
|- align="center" bgcolor="ffbbbb"
| 12 || April 12 || Cardinals || 8 – 7 (10) || Isringhausen (1–0) || Threets (0–1) || Reyes (1) || 35,717 || 4–8
|- align="center" bgcolor="bbffbb"
| 13 || April 13 || Cardinals || 7–4 || Lincecum (2–0) || Piñeiro (0–1) || Wilson (3) || 37,195 || 5–8
|- align="center" bgcolor="bbffbb"
| 14 ||April 14 || D-backs || 5–4 || Yabu (1–1) || Qualls (0–1) || Wilson (4) || 30,371 || 6–8
|- align="center" bgcolor="ffbbbb"
| 15 || April 15 || D-backs || 8–2 || Owings (3–0) || Correia (1–2) || || 30,068 || 6–9
|- align="center" bgcolor="ffbbbb"
| 16 || April 16 || D-backs || 4–1 || Webb (4–0) || Zito (0–4) || Lyon (3) || 30,510 || 6–10
|- align="center" bgcolor="ffbbbb"
| 17 || April 18 || @ Cardinals || 11–1 || Wellemeyer (2–0) || Cain (0–2) || || 40,684 || 6–11
|- align="center" bgcolor="bbffbb"
| 18 ||April 19 || @ Cardinals || 3–0 || Lincecum (3–0) || Piñeiro (0–2) || Wilson (5) || 41,707 || 7–11
|- align="center" bgcolor="bbffbb"
| 19 || April 20 || @ Cardinals || 8–2 || Sánchez (1–1) || Looper (3–1) || || 41,127 || 8–11
|- align="center" bgcolor="ffbbbb"
| 20 || April 21 || @ D-backs || 4–2 || Owings (4–0) || Correia (1–3) || Lyon (4) || 22,097 || 8–12
|- align="center" bgcolor="ffbbbb"
| 21 || April 22 || @ D-backs || 5–4 || Webb (5–0) || Zito (0–5) || Lyon (5) || 25,074 || 8–13
|- align="center" bgcolor="bbffbb"
| 22 || April 23 || @ Padres || 3 – 2 (13) || Yabu (2–1) || Rusch (0–2) || Wilson (6) || 25,506 || 9–13
|- align="center" bgcolor="bbffbb"
| 23 || April 24 || @ Padres || 1–0 || Lincecum (4–0) || Young (1–2) || Wilson (7) || 26,789 || 10–13
|- align="center" bgcolor="bbffbb"
| 24 ||April 25 || Reds || 3–1 ||Sánchez (2–1) || Harang (1–3) || Wilson (8) || 34,657 || 11–13 
|- align="center" bgcolor="ffbbbb"
| 25 || April 26 || Reds || 10–9 || Belisle (1–1) || Hennessey (1–1) || Cordero (3) || 34,215 || 11–14
|- align="center" bgcolor="ffbbbb"
| 26 || April 27 || Reds || 10–1 || Vólquez (4–0) || Zito (0–6) || || 39,050 || 11–15
|- align="center" bgcolor="bbffbb"
| 27 || April 28 || Rockies||4–0 || Cain (1–2) || Morales (1–2) || || 30,153 || 12–15
|- align="center" bgcolor="ffbbbb"
| 28 || April 29 || Rockies ||3–2 || Cook (4–1) || Lincecum (4–1) ||Fuentes (2) || 32,176 || 12–16
|- align="center" bgcolor="bbffbb"
| 29 || April 30 || Rockies ||3–2 || Valdez (1–0) || Speier (1–2) || Wilson (9) || 30,509 || 13–16
|-

|- align="center" bgcolor="ffbbbb"
| 30 || May 2  || @ Phillies || 6–5 (10) || Romero (2–0) || Wilson (0–1) || || 38,270 || 13–17
|- align="center" bgcolor="bbffbb"
| 31 || May 3  || @ Phillies || 3–2 (10) || Taschner (1–0) || Seánez (2–2) || Wilson (10) || 43,804 || 14–17
|- align="center" bgcolor="ffbbbb"
| 32 || May 4  || @ Phillies || 6–5 || Lidge (1–0) || Yabu (2–2) || || 45,110 || 14–18
|- align="center" bgcolor="ffbbbb"
| 33 || May 6  || @ Pirates || 12–6 || Duke (1–2) || Sánchez (2–2) || || 12,030 || 14–19
|- align="center" bgcolor="ffbbbb"
| 34 || May 7  || @ Pirates || 3–1 || Dumatrait (1–1) || Zito (0–7) || Capps (7) || 9,788 || 14–20
|- align="center" bgcolor="ffbbbb"
| 35 || May 8  || @ Pirates || 5–4 || Osoria (2–1) || Cain (1–3) || Capps (8)|| 16,816 || 14–21
|- align="center" bgcolor="ffbbbb"
| 36 || May 9 || Phillies ||7–4 || Hamels (4–3) || Walker (1–1) || Lidge (9) || 33,796 || 14–22
|- align="center" bgcolor="bbffbb"
| 37 || May 10 || Phillies || 8–2 || Lincecum (5–1) || Moyer (2–3) || || 34,064 || 15–22
|- align="center" bgcolor="bbffbb"
| 38 || May 11 || Phillies || 4–3 || Taschner (2–0)|| Romero (3–1) || Wilson (11) || 35,999 || 16–22
|- align="center" bgcolor="ffbbbb"
| 39 || May 12 || Astros || 7–3 || Oswalt (4–3)||Chulk (0–1) || Valderde (9) ||30,165 ||16–23
|- align="center" bgcolor="bbffbb"
| 40 || May 13 || Astros || 4–2 || Cain (2–3) || Backe (2–5) || Wilson (12) || 30,858|| 17–23
|- align="center" bgcolor="ffbbbb"
| 41 || May 14 || Astros || 6–3|| Villarreal (1–3) || Taschner (2–1)  || Valverde (10) || 33,070 || 17–24
|- align="center" bgcolor="ffbbbb"
| 42 || May 15 || Astros || 8–7|| Byrdak (2–0) || Chulk (0–2) || Valverde (11) || 33,771|| 17–25
|- align="center" bgcolor="ffbbbb"
| 43 || May 16 || White Sox || 2–0 || Floyd (4–2) || Sánchez  (2–3)  || Jenks (9) || 35,482 || 17–26
|- align="center" bgcolor="ffbbbb"
| 44 || May 17 || White Sox || 3–1 || Buehrle (2–5)  || Zito (0–8) || Jenks (10) || 37,006 || 17–27
|- align="center" bgcolor="ffbbbb"
| 45 || May 18 || White Sox || 13–8 || Thornton (1–0) || Walker (1–2) || Masset (1) || 34,331 || 17–28
|- align="center" bgcolor="ffbbbb"
| 46 || May 19 || @ Rockies || 4–3 || Grilli (1–0) || Chulk (0–3) || Fuentes (6) || 28,362 || 17–29
|- align="center" bgcolor="bbffbb"
| 47 || May 20 || @ Rockies || 6–5 || Lincecum (6–1) || Cook (6–3) || Wilson (13) || 28,361 || 18–29
|- align="center" bgcolor="bbffbb"
| 48 || May 21 || @ Rockies || 3 – 2 (10) || Walker (2–2) || Herges (2–1) || Wilson (14) || 27,081 || 19–29
|- align="center" bgcolor="bbffbb"
| 49 || May 23 || @ Marlins || 8–2 || Zito (1–8) || Olsen (4–2) || || 15,003 || 20–29
|-align="center" bgcolor="#bbbbbb"
| – || May 24 || @ Marlins || colspan=6|Postponed (rain)  Rescheduled for May 25
|- align="center" bgcolor="ffbbbb"
| 50 || May 25 || @ Marlins ||8–6|| Hendrickson (7–2) || Misch (0–1) || Gregg (10) || || 20–30
|- align="center" bgcolor="ffbbbb"
| 51 || May 25 || @ Marlins || 5–4 || Gregg (4–2) ||Walker (2–3) || || 14,674 || 20–31
|- align="center" bgcolor="bbffbb"
| 52 || May 27 || @ D-backs ||6–3|| Lincecum (7–1) || Haren (5–4) ||Wilson (15) || 23,604 || 21–31
|- align="center" bgcolor="bbffbb"
| 53 || May 28 || @ D-backs || 11–3 || Sánchez (3–3) ||Davis (2–2) || || 24,336 || 22–31
|- align="center" bgcolor="bbffbb"
| 54 || May 29 || @ D-backs || 4–3 || Walker (3–3) || Qualls (0–5) || Wilson (16)|| 21,037 || 23–31
|- align="center" bgcolor="ffbbbb"
| 55 || May 30 || Padres || 7–3 (13) || Baek (1–0)|| Sadler (0–1) || || 37,178 || 23–32
|- align="center" bgcolor="ffbbbb"
| 56 || May 31 || Padres || 5–1 || Banks (2–0) || Misch (0–2) || || 34,921 || 23–33
|-

|- align="center" bgcolor="bbffbb"
| 57 || June 1 || Padres || 4–3 (10) || Hinshaw (1–0) || Hoffman (0–4) || || 33,867 || 24–33
|- align="center" bgcolor="bbffbb"
| 58 || June 2 || Mets || 10–2 || Sánchez (4–3) || Pérez (4–4) || || 36,126 || 25–33
|- align="center" bgcolor="ffbbbb"
| 59 || June 3 || Mets || 9–6 || Martínez (1–0) || Zito (1–9) || Wagner (12) ||35,233 ||25–34
|- align="center" bgcolor="ffbbbb"
| 60 || June 4 || Mets || 5–3 || Maine (6–4) || Cain (2–4) || Wagner (13) ||35,646 ||25–35
|- align="center" bgcolor="bbffbb"
| 61 || June 6 || @ Nationals || 10–1 || Lincecum (8–1) || Bergmann (1–3) || || 25,987 || 26–35
|- align="center" bgcolor="bbffbb"
| 62 || June 7 || @ Nationals || 6–0 || Sánchez (5–3) || Hill (0–3) || || 30,652 || 27–35
|- align="center" bgcolor="bbffbb"
| 63 || June 8 || @ Nationals || 6–3 || Zito (2–9) || Mock (0–1) ||Wilson (17) || 30,224 || 28–35
|- align="center" bgcolor="bbffbb"
| 64 || June 9 || @ Nationals || 3–2 || Cain (3–4) || Clippard (0–1) || Wilson (18) || 26,209 || 29–35
|- align="center" bgcolor="ffbbbb"
| 65 || June 10 || @ Rockies || 10–5 || Cook (9–3) || Misch (0–3) || || 28,359 || 29–36
|- align="center" bgcolor="ffbbbb"
| 66 || June 11 || @ Rockies || 1–0 || Fuentes (1–2)  || Yabu || || 26,235 || 29–37
|- align="center" bgcolor="bbffbb"
| 67 || June 12 || @ Rockies || 10–7 || Sánchez (6–3) || Reynolds (1–4) || Wilson (19) || 30,376 || 30–37
|- align="center" bgcolor="ffbbbb"
| 68 || June 13 || Athletics || 5–1 || Smith (4–5) || Zito (2–10) || || 42,445 || 30–38
|- align="center" bgcolor="ffbbbb"
| 69 || June 14 || Athletics || 4–0 || Harden (4–0) || Cain (3–5) || || 40,873 || 30–39
|- align="center" bgcolor="ffbbbb"
| 70 || June 15 || Athletics || 5–3 || Eveland (5–5) || Correia (1–4) || Street (13) || 41,547 || 30–40
|- align="center" bgcolor="bbffbb"
| 71 || June 16 || Tigers || 8–6 || Yabu (3–3)  || Dolsi (0–2) || || 33,317 || 31–40
|- align="center" bgcolor="ffbbbb"
| 72 || June 17 || Tigers || 5–1 || Rogers (5–4) || Sánchez (6–4)  || || 33,636 || 31–41
|- align="center" bgcolor="ffbbbb"
| 73 || June 18 || Tigers || 7–2 || Galarraga (7–2) || Zito (2–11) || || 38,194 || 31–42
|- align="center" bgcolor="bbffbb"
| 74 || June 20 || @ Royals || 9–4 || Cain (4–5) || Yabuta (1–3) || || 34,588 || 32–42
|- align="center" bgcolor="ffbbbb"
| 75 || June 21 || @ Royals || 5–3 || Meche (5–8) || Correia (1–5) || Soria (19) || 28,903 || 32–43
|- align="center" bgcolor="ffbbbb"
| 76 || June 22 || @ Royals || 11–10 || Mahay (3–0)  || Hinshaw (1–1)  || Soria (20) || 20,499 || 32–44
|- align="center" bgcolor="bbffbb"
| 77 || June 24 || @ Indians || 3–2 || Sánchez (7–4) || Betancourt (2–4) || Wilson (20) || 29,024 || 33–44
|- align="center" bgcolor="bbffbb"
| 78 || June 25 || @ Indians || 4–1 || Zito (3–11) || Sowers (0–3) || Wilson (21) || 25,654 || 34–44
|- align="center" bgcolor="ffbbbb"
| 79 || June 26 || @ Indians || 4–1 || Lee (11–1) || Cain (4–6) || Borowski (6) || 25,257 || 34–45
|- align="center" bgcolor="ffbbbb"
| 80 || June 27 || @ Athletics || 4–1 || Eveland (6–5) || Yabu (3–4) || Street (15) || 27,125 || 34–46
|- align="center" bgcolor="bbffbb"
| 81 || June 28 || @ Athletics || 1–0 || Lincecum (9–1) || Duchscherer (8–5) || Wilson (22) ||36,067 ||  35–46
|- align="center" bgcolor="bbffbb"
| 82 || June 29 || @ Athletics || 11–1 ||Sánchez (8–4) || Blanton (4–11) || || 33,841 || 36–46
|- align="center" bgcolor="ffbbbb"
| 83 || June 30 || Cubs || 9–2 ||Lilly (9–5)|| Zito (3–12) || || 35,311 || 36–47
|-

|- align="center" bgcolor="bbffbb"
| 84 || July 1 || Cubs || 2–1 || Cain (5–6) || Marquis (6–5)|| Wilson (23)|| 33,858 || 37–47
|- align="center" bgcolor="ffbbbb"
| 85 || July 2 || Cubs || 6–5 || Mármol (2–3) || Walker (3–4) || Wood (21) || 41,345 || 37–48
|- align="center" bgcolor="bbffbb"
| 86 || July 3 || Cubs || 8–3 || Lincecum (10–1) || Gallagher (3–4) || || 40,511 || 38–48
|- align="center" bgcolor="ffbbbb"
| 87 || July 4 || Dodgers || 10–7 || Lowe (6–8) || Matos (0–1) || Saito (15) || 40,447 || 38–49
|- align="center" bgcolor="bbffbb"
| 88 || July 5 || Dodgers || 5–2 || Zito (4–12) || Falkenborg (0–1) || Wilson (24) || 40,741 || 39–49
|- align="center" bgcolor="ffbbbb"
| 89 || July 6 || Dodgers || 5–3 || Falkenborg (1–1) || Cain (5–7) || Saito (16) || 39,290 || 39–50
|- align="center" bgcolor="ffbbbb"
| 90 || July 8 || @ Mets || 7–0 || Pelfrey (7–6) || Lincecum (10–2) || || 48,887 || 39–51
|- align="center" bgcolor="ffbbbb"
| 91 || July 9 || @ Mets || 5–0 || Santana (8–7) || Sánchez (8–5) || || 48,896 || 39–52
|- align="center" bgcolor="ffbbbb"
| 92 || July 10 || @ Mets || 7–3 || Schoeneweis (1–2) || Romo (0–1) || || 48,755 || 39–53
|- align="center" bgcolor="ffbbbb"
| 93 || July 11 || @ Cubs || 3–1 || Howry (3–2) || Walker (3–5) || Wood (24) || 41,605 || 39–54
|- align="center" bgcolor="ffbbbb"
| 94 || July 12 || @ Cubs || 8 – 7 (11) || Marshall (2–2) || Wilson (0–2) || || 41,555 || 39–55 
|- align="center" bgcolor="bbffbb"
| 95 || July 13 || @ Cubs || 4–2 || Lincecum (11–2) || Dempster (10–4) || Wilson (25) || 41,574 || 40–55
|- align="center" bgcolor="ffbbbb"
| 96 || July 18 || Brewers || 9–1 || Sabathia (9–8) || Cain (5–8) || || 40,882 || 40–56
|- align="center" bgcolor="ffbbbb"
| 97 || July 19 || Brewers || 8–5 || Villanueva (4–5) || Matos (0–2) || Torres (16) || 36,852 || 40–57
|- align="center" bgcolor="ffbbbb"
| 98 || July 20 || Brewers || 7–4 || Parra (9–2) || Lincecum (11–3) || Torres (17) || 37,507 || 40–58
|- align="center" bgcolor="bbffbb"
| 99 || July 22 || Nationals || 6- 3 || Zito (5–12) || Bergmann (1–7) || Wilson (26) || 34,813 || 41–58
|- align="center" bgcolor="bbffbb"
| 100 || July 23 || Nationals || 6–4 || Espineli (1–0) || Ayala (1–6) || Wilson (27) || 35,539 || 42–58
|- align="center" bgcolor="bbffbb"
| 101 || July 24 || Nationals || 1–0 || Cain (6–8) || Redding (7–5) || || 36,963 || 43–58
|- align="center" bgcolor="ffbbbb"
| 102 || July 25 || D-backs || 10–2 || Haren (10–5) || Sánchez (8–6) || || 32,851 || 43–59
|- align="center" bgcolor="ffbbbb"
| 103 || July 26 || D-backs || 5–3 || Webb (14–4) || Walker (3–6) || Lyon (21) || 37,094 || 43–60
|- align="center" bgcolor="ffbbbb"
| 104 || July 27 || D-backs || 7–2 || Johnson (8–7) || Zito (5–13) || || 40,071 || 43–61
|- align="center" bgcolor="bbffbb"
| 105 || July 28 || @ Dodgers || 7–6 || Correia (2–5) || Kuroda (5–8) || Wilson (28) || 37,483 || 44–61
|- align="center" bgcolor="ffbbbb"
| 106 || July 29 || @ Dodgers || 2–0 || Johnson (1–0) || Cain (6–9) || Broxton (5) || 40,110 || 44–62
|- align="center" bgcolor="ffbbbb"
| 107 || July 30 || @ Dodgers || 4–0 || Billingsley (11–9) || Sánchez (8–7) || || 41,282 || 44–63
|-

|- align="center" bgcolor="bbffbb"
| 108 || August 1 || @ Padres || 3 – 2 (10) || Romo (1–1) || Hoffman (1–6) || Wilson (29) || 33,926 || 45–63
|- align="center" bgcolor="bbffbb"
| 109 || August 2 || @ Padres || 2–0 || Zito (6–13) || Peavy (8–7) || Wilson (30) ||41,688 || 46–63
|- align="center" bgcolor="ffbbbb"
| 110 || August 3 || @ Padres || 4–1 || Maddux (5–8) || Correia (2–6) || Hoffman (23) || 33,060 || 46–64
|- align="center" bgcolor="bbffbb"
| 111 || August 4 || Braves || 4–2 || Cain (7–9) || Jurrjens (10–7) || Wilson (31) || 37,473 || 47–64
|- align="center" bgcolor="ffbbbb"
| 112 || August 5 || Braves || 11–4 || Hampton (1–0) || Sánchez (8–8) || || 36,098 || 47–65
|- align="center" bgcolor="bbffbb"
| 113 || August 6 || Braves || 3–2 || Lincecum (12–3) || James (2–5) || Wilson (32) || 39,955 || 48–65
|- align="center" bgcolor="ffbbbb"
| 114 || August 8 || Dodgers || 6–2 || Penny (6–9) || Zito (6–14) || Broxton (7) || 40,142 || 48–66
|- align="center" bgcolor="bbffbb"
| 115 || August 9 || Dodgers || 3 – 2 (10) || Walker (4–6) || Broxton (2–3) || || 41,963 || 49–66
|- align="center" bgcolor="bbffbb"
| 116 || August 10 || Dodgers || 5–4 || Taschner (3–1) || Kuo (3–2) || || 41,804 || 50–66
|- align="center" bgcolor="ffbbbb"
| 117 || August 11 || @ Astros || 3–1 || Backe (7–11) || Sánchez (8–9) || Valverde (29) || 28,220 || 50–67
|- align="center" bgcolor="ffbbbb"
| 118 || August 12 || @ Astros || 12–4 || Oswalt (10–8) || Walker (4–7) || || 29,451 || 50–68
|- align="center" bgcolor="ffbbbb"
| 119 || August 13 || @ Astros || 6–2 || Wolf (8–10) || Zito (6–15) || || 30,330 || 50–69
|- align="center" bgcolor="ffbbbb"
| 120 || August 14 || @ Astros || 7–4 || Hawkins (2–1) || Yabu (3–5) || Valverde (30) || 33,612 || 50–70
|- align="center" bgcolor="bbffbb"
| 121 || August 15 || @ Braves || 5–1 || Cain (8–9) || Jurrjens (11–8) || || 30,682 || 51–70
|- align="center" bgcolor="ffbbbb"
| 122 || August 16 || @ Braves || 11–5 || Hampton (2–1) || Palmer (0–1) || || 41,893 || 51–71
|- align="center" bgcolor="bbffbb"
| 123 || August 17 || @ Braves || 3–1 || Lincecum (13–3) || Morton (3–7) || Wilson (33) || 30,503 || 52–71
|- align="center" bgcolor="bbffbb"
| 124 || August 18 || @ Braves || 5–0 || Zito (7–15) || Campillo (7–6) || || 18,113 || 53–71
|- align="center" bgcolor="ffbbbb"
| 125 || August 19 || Marlins || 6–0 || Nolasco (12–7) || Correia (2–7) || || 33,098 || 53–72
|- align="center" bgcolor="bbffbb"
| 126 || August 20 || Marlins || 6–5 || Wilson (1–2) || Lindstrom (1–2) || || 30,399 || 54–72
|- align="center" bgcolor="bbffbb"
| 127 || August 21 || Marlins || 4–3 || Wilson (1–3) || Gregg (6–6) || || 32,515 || 55–72
|- align="center" bgcolor="bbffbb"
| 128 || August 22 || Padres || 5–0 || Lincecum (14–3) || Baek (4–9) || || 33,615 || 56–72
|- align="center" bgcolor="bbffbb"
| 129 || August 23 || Padres || 4–3 || Zito (8–15) || Adams (1–2) || Wilson (34) || 37,081 || 57–72
|- align="center" bgcolor="bbffbb"
| 130 || August 24 || Padres || 7–4 || Correia (3–7) || Adams (1–3) || Wilson (35) || 37,174 || 58–72
|- align="center" bgcolor="ffbbbb"
| 131 || August 25 || Rockies || 4–2 || Francis (4–8) || Cain (8–10) || Fuentes (26) || 31,132 || 58–73
|- align="center" bgcolor="ffbbbb"
| 132 || August 26 || Rockies || 7–2 || de la Rosa (7–7) || Palmer (0–2) || Grilli (1) || 32,695 || 58–74
|- align="center" bgcolor="bbffbb"
| 133 || August 27 || Rockies || 4–1 || Lincecum (15–3) || Hernández (11–11) || Wilson (36) || 31,627 || 59–74
|- align="center" bgcolor="ffbbbb"
| 134 || August 29 || @ Reds || 11–7 || Vólquez (16–5) || Zito (8–16) || || 25,445 || 59–75
|- align="center" bgcolor="ffbbbb"
| 135 || August 30 || @ Reds ||7–6 || Lincoln (2–5) || Taschner (3–2) || Cordero (26)|| 21,729 || 59–76
|- align="center" bgcolor="ffbbbb"
| 136 || August 31 || @ Reds || 9–3 || Arroyo (13–10) || Cain (8–11) || || 26,519 || 59–77
|-

|- align="center" bgcolor="ffbbbb"
| 137 || September 1 || @ Rockies || 4–0 || de la Rosa (8–7) || Sánchez (8–10) || || 31,388 || 59–78
|- align="center" bgcolor="ffbbbb"
| 138 || September 2 || @ Rockies || 6–5 (12) || Grilli (3–2) || Yabu (3–6) || || 23,710 || 59–79
|- align="center" bgcolor="bbffbb"
| 139 || September 3 || @ Rockies || 9–2 || Zito (9–16) || Cook (16–9) || || 23,481 || 60–79
|- align="center" bgcolor="ffbbbb"
| 140 || September 5 || Pirates || 7–0 || Duke (5–13) || Correia (3–8) || || 31,133 || 60–80
|- align="center" bgcolor="bbffbb"
| 141 || September 6 || Pirates || 7–6 || Espineli (2–0) || Bautista (4–3) || Wilson (37)|| 38,094|| 61–80
|- align="center" bgcolor="bbffbb"
| 142 || September 7 || Pirates || 11–6 || Matos (1–2) || Karstens (2–5) || || 34,122 || 62–80
|- align="center" bgcolor="bbffbb"
| 143 || September 8 || D-backs || 6–2 || Lincecum (16–3) || Petit (3–5) || || 30,252 || 63–80
|- align="center" bgcolor="bbffbb"
| 144 || September 9 || D-backs || 5–4 || Wilson (3–2) || Rauch (4–7) || || 30,518 || 64–80
|- align="center" bgcolor="bbffbb"
| 145 || September 10 || D-backs || 4–3 || Hinshaw (2–1) || Lyon (2–5) || || 30,992 || 65–80
|- align="center" bgcolor="ffbbbb"
| 146 || September 11 || @ Padres || 11–3 || Geer (2–0) || Cain (8–12) || || 30,497 || 65–81
|- align="center" bgcolor="bbffbb"
| 147 || September 12 || @ Padres || 5–2 || Sánchez (9–10) || Peavy (9–11) || Wilson (38) || 24,610 || 66–81
|- align="center" bgcolor="bbffbb"
| 148 || September 13 || @ Padres || 7–0 || Lincecum (17–3) || Young (5–6) || || 31,015 || 67–81
|- align="center" bgcolor="bbffbb"
| 149 || September 14 || @ Padres || 8–6 (10) || Romo (2–1) || Hayhurst (0–2) || Wilson (39) || 25,476 || 68–81
|- align="center" bgcolor="ffbbbb"
| 150 || September 15 || @ D-backs || 3–1 || Peña (2–2) || Hennessey (1–2) || Qualls (4) || 25,969 || 68–82
|- align="center" bgcolor="ffbbbb"
| 151 || September 16 || @ D-backs || 2–0 || Haren (15–8) || Cain (8–13) ||  || 33,195 || 68–83
|- align="center" bgcolor="ffbbbb"
| 152 || September 17 || @ D-backs || 7–6 || Webb (21–7) || Sánchez (9–11) || Peña (3) || 22,618 || 68–84
|- align="center" bgcolor="ffbbbb"
| 153 || September 18 || @ D-backs || 3–2 || Cruz (3–0) || Lincecum (17–4) || Qualls (5) || 34,323 || 68–85
|- align="center" bgcolor="bbffbb"
| 154 || September 19 || @ Dodgers || 7–1 || Zito (10–16) || Maddux (7–13) || || 55,589 || 69–85
|- align="center" bgcolor="ffbbbb"
| 155 || September 20 || @ Dodgers || 10–7 || Saito (4–3) || Walker (4–8) || || 55,724 || 69–86
|- align="center" bgcolor="bbffbb"
| 156 || September 21 || @ Dodgers || 1–0 (10) || Romo (3–1) || Saito (4–4) || Wilson (40) || 55,294 || 70–86
|- align="center" bgcolor="ffbbbb"
| 157 || September 23 || Rockies || 9–4 || Jiménez (12–12) || Lincecum (17–5) || || 33,922 || 70–87
|- align="center" bgcolor="ffbbbb"
| 158 || September 24 || Rockies || 15–6 || Hernández (3–3) || Sánchez (9–12) || || 31,942 || 70–88
|- align="center" bgcolor="ffbbbb"
| 159 || September 25 || Rockies || 3–1 || de la Rosa (10–8) || Zito (10–17) || Fuentes (30) || 31,857 || 70–89
|- align="center" bgcolor="bbffbb"
| 160 || September 26 || Dodgers || 6–5 || Walker (5–8) || Johnson (1–2) || || 33,920 || 71–89
|- align="center" bgcolor="ffbbbb"
| 161 || September 27 || Dodgers || 2–1 || Maddux (8–13) || Cain (8–14) || Saito (18) || 38,673 || 71–90
|- align="center" bgcolor="bbffbb"
| 162 || September 28 || Dodgers || 3–1 || Lincecum (18–5) || Park (4–4) || || 39,167 || 72–90
|-

Roster

Player stats

Batting
Note: G = Games played; AB = At bats; R = Runs; H = Hits; 2B = Doubles; 3B = Triples; HR = Home runs; RBI = Runs batted in; SB = Stolen bases; BB = Walks; AVG = Batting average; SLG = Slugging percentage

Source:

Pitching
Note: W = Wins; L = Losses; ERA = Earned run average; G = Games pitched; GS = Games started; SV = Saves; IP = Innings pitched; H = Hits allowed; R = Runs allowed; ER = Earned runs allowed; BB = Walks allowed; SO = Strikeouts

Source:

Awards and honors
 Bengie Molina C, Willie Mac Award
All-Star Game

Farm system

LEAGUE CHAMPIONS: Augusta, AZL Giants

References

External links

2008 San Francisco Giants season at Baseball Reference

San Francisco Giants
San Francisco Giants seasons
San Francisco Giants
2008 in San Francisco